Yukarısöğütlü can refer to:

 Yukarısöğütlü, Besni
 Yukarısöğütlü, Köprüköy